Kendrapara (Sl. No.: 97) is a Vidhan Sabha constituency of Kendrapara district, Odisha.

This constituency includes Kendrapara, Kendrapara block and 12 Gram panchayats (Alapua, Taradipal, Penthapal, Andara, Baluria, Amrutamanohi, Nilakanthapur, Balipatana, Narasinghpur, Badamulabasanta, Dihapada and Singhagan) of Pattamundai block.

Elected Members

Sixteen elections were held between 1951 and 2014 including one By-Poll in 1952.

Elected members from the Kendrapara constituency are:
2014: (97): Kishore Chandra Tarai (BJD)
2009: (97): Sipra Mallick (BJD)
2004: (33): Utkal Keshari Parida (Odisha Gana Parishad)
2000: (33): Bed Prakash Agarwal (BJP)
1995: (33): Bhagabat Prasad Mohanty (Congress)
1990: (33): Bed Prakash Agarwal (Janata Dal)
1985: (33): Bhagabat Prasad Mohanty (Congress)
1980: (33): Indramani Rout (Congress-I)
1977: (33): Bed Prakash Agarwal (Janata Party)
1974: (33): Bed Prakash Agarwal (Utkal Congress)
1971: (31): Bhagabat Prasad Mohanty (PSP)
1967: (31): Saroj Kanta Kanungo (PSP)
1961: (112): Dhruba Charan Sahu (PSP)
1957: (80): Prahalad Malik (Congress)
1952: (By-Poll): N. Purusottam (Congress)
1951: (69): Dinabandhu Sahu (Congress)

2014 Election Result
In 2014 election, Biju Janata Dal candidate Kishore Chandra Tarai defeated Indian National Congress candidate Ganeswara Behera by a margin of 5,431 votes.

2009 Election Results
In 2009 election, Biju Janata Dal candidate Sipra Mallick defeated Indian National Congress candidate Ganeswara Behera by a margin of 15,931 votes.

Notes

References

Assembly constituencies of Odisha
Kendrapara district